Ruslan Kurbanov is a Russian political expert, a social activist and a columnist, Director of the foundation for the support of humanitarian initiatives “Altair”, a Senior Fellow of the Institute of Oriental Studies of the Russian Academy of Sciences. Born October 26, 1976, in South-Dagestanian village Kurakh, he is an ethnic Lezgin. His research has been presented in numerous publications and broadcast through various news outlets. He has been a guest speaker at national radio and TV programs.

Education and Scientific activities

Kurbanov has received a Specialist Diploma in Economics from Dagestan State University. In 2004, he earned a PhD degree in Politics from Saint Petersburg State University. In 2002 – 2005, he served as Head of the Department of Conflicts and Informational Security at the Center for Strategic Research and Political Technology in the Republic of Dagestan. In 2006, he conducted lectures at the Abou-Nour University in Damascus. Since 2007, he has served as a Senior Fellow of the Institute of Oriental Studies of the Russian Academy of Sciences. He has authored numerous monographs and research articles on Islam, social and legal aspects of Muslim community and its integration in non-Muslim countries.

Professional activities

In 2003, he held a position of Editor-in-chief of daily news program “Dagestan News” on State Television and Radio Broadcasting Company “Dagestan”. In 2003–2005, he was an author and linkman of historical TV show “Seven Winds”.  In 2008–2009, Dr. Kurbanov headed the department known as “World beyond the West” of Foundation for Effective Politics. In the same period, he was Editor-in-chief of “The Senate” program of the Russian Federation Council. In 2011–2012, he worked as Editor-in-chief of "Caucasian Politics" analytical portal. Since 2012, he has directed the foundation for support of humanitarian initiatives “Altair”.

Public activities 

2003–present: Head, Young Political Researches School at the Regional Center of Ethnopolitical Researches of the Dagestan scientific Center of the Russian Academy of Sciences.
2004–present: Head, socio-cultural movement “Young Republic”.
2006–present: Member, Research Committee on Human Rights, Russian Association of Political Science. 
2007 – present: Co-chairman, Russian Congress of Caucasian Nations.
2009-2012: Head, Experts Council of Working Group for Development of Public Dialogue and Institutes of Civil Society at the Russian Civic Chamber.
2011–present: included in the list of candidates to Russian State Duma from Dagestani regional public organization “Dagestan Civil Union” along with other candidates like Ramazan Abdulatipov, Sergey Reshulsky and others.
2010 – present: Head, Experts Council Committee for Cooperation with Mass Media at Russian muftis Council
2013 – present: Vice-president, Federal Lezgin National Cultural Autonomy.

See articles in English 

 Kurbanov R. Globalization of Muslim consciousness in the Caucasus: Islamic call and jihad 
 Kurbanov R. Revival of the North Caucasian Umma in the light of Russia’s foreign policy flaws in the Islamic world
 Kurbanov R. The unpredictable triangle: Azerbaijan, Iran, Israel
 Kurbanov R. Muslim Scholars Meet in Russia on Radicalism
 Kurbanov R. Banning Hadiths and Seerah in Russia
 Kurbanov R. Battles around hijab in Russia. Prohibitions and murders
 Kurbanov R. Prohibition of Hadiths and Prophetic Seerah as a chance for Russian Muslims
 Kurbanov R. "Russian Ijmaa" on Jihad and Ideological Split of Muslim Community
 Kurbanov R. Tatarstan:Smooth Islamization Sprinkled with Blood
 Kurbanov R. Russian Imams killed in dozen
 Corruption forms ethnic “enclaves”
  “Young believers turn into a serious force in the North Caucasus”
  "Radicalization of Muslim young people"
  Azerbaijan checks the strength of Russian State
  No clear picture of investigation into Moscow metro terror acts

References 

1976 births
Living people
People from Dagestan
Lezgins
Russian Muslims
Russian people of Lezgian descent
Russian political scientists
Russian writers
21st-century Muslim scholars of Islam
Islam in Russia
Saint Petersburg State University alumni